The Nuu-chah-nulth Tribal Council is a First Nations Tribal Council in the Canadian province of British Columbia, located on the west coast of Vancouver Island. The organization is based in Port Alberni, British Columbia.

History 

The Nuu-chah-nulth Tribal Council began as the West Coast Allied Tribes in 1958, but then incorporated as a non-profit society called the West Coast District Society of Indian Chiefs in 1973. In 2009, the name was changed to the Nuu-chah-nulth Tribal Council (NTC) (NTC, 2008).
The northern boundary of Nuu-chah-nulth territory begins on the west coast of Vancouver Island at Brooks Peninsula and the southern boundary is at Port Renfrew. The territory extends inland about halfway across the island to encompass Gold River and Port Alberni. There are fourteen tribes that comprise the Nuu-chah-nulth Nations. These tribes share many aspects of their culture, language and traditions. Each Nation can have several "houses" that are centered on a Ha’wiih (hereditary chief) who is responsible for their Ha’houlthee (chiefly territories) (NTC, 2008).

Member First Nations

Southern region

Ditidaht First Nation (Niitiinaʔatḥ)
Huu-ay-aht First Nation (Huuʕiiʔatḥ)
Hupacasath First Nation (Huupač̓asʔatḥ)
Tseshaht First Nation (C̓išaaʔatḥ)
Uchucklesaht First Nation (Ḥuučuqƛisʔatḥ)

Central region
Ahousaht First Nation (ʕaaḥuusʔatḥ)
Hesquiaht First Nation (Ḥiškʷiiʔstḥ)
Tla-o-qui-aht First Nations (ƛaʔuukʷiʔatḥ)
Toquaht First Nation (T̓uk̓ʷaaʔatḥ)
Yuułuʔiłʔatḥ (Ucluelet First Nation)

Northern region
Ehattesaht First Nation (ʔiiḥatisʔatḥ)
Kyuquot/Cheklesahht First Nation(Qaay̓uuk̓ʷatḥ/Č̓iiqƛisʔstḥ)  
Mowachaht/Muchalaht First Nations (Muwačʔatḥ/Mačłaʔatḥ)
Nuchatlaht First Nation (Nučaaƛʔatḥ)

Note: The Pacheedaht First Nation (P̓aačiinaʔatḥ), though Nuu-chah-nulth by culture and language, is not a member of the Nuu-chah-nulth Tribal Council.  Similarly the closely related Ditidaht of the Ditidaht First Nation and the Makah (Qʷiniščiʔatḥ) of the other side of the Strait of Juan de Fuca are not members of the Nuu-chah-nulth Tribal Council.

Roles and Responsibilities 

The NTC provides programs and services to approximately 8,000 registered members, of which about 2,000 live off reserve (NTC, 2008a). The Central Region is by far the largest component 
of the NTC at the present time.

The role of the NTC is to represent its member nations and provide a variety of programs and services to them. It can coordinate projects (i.e., fisheries, training), oversee issues that overlap jurisdictions and can take advantage of economies of scale or cross regional planning opportunities. As well, it can act as a sounding board and coordinator on many issues of common concern.
The NTC operates many programs that help further the wellbeing of the communities within their sphere of influence. The NTC provides programs for its members in the following areas:

- Child Welfare

- Fisheries

- Economic Development

- Membership

- Education & Training

- Financial Administrative Support

- Employment & Training

- Infrastructure Development

- Health

- Newspaper (Ha-Shilth-Sa)

- Social Development

- Teechuktl (mental health)

The NTC works with its membership through a programs/services funding formula where each nation receives some portion of their funding based on population and some portion of their funding based on program application. Some programs (child welfare, fisheries, and training) are administered by NTC staff on behalf of the bands. As treaties are negotiated or as capacities build within individual nations, new funding agreements are being negotiated annually. This is shifting the emphasis away from centralized programs towards a greater degree of band-management.

Structure and Administration 

The Nuu-chah-nulth Tribal Council draws on the resources of fourteen tribes to provide staff and expertise. Not all staff, however, are members of its member nations. The NTC is presided over by a President, Vice-President and an Executive Director. To ensure all areas have access to the administrative body, staff positions are organized to ensure staff coverage for all regions. These include office managers for the Southern and Central Region and Northern Region, secretaries, receptionists and a file clerk. The NTC Board of Directors is composed of the elected Chiefs from each Nation.

Sources 
Ecotrust Canada. Sharmalene Mendis-Millard, "Nuu-chah-nulth Tribal Council," in Daniel Arbour, Brenda Kuecks & Danielle Edwards (editors).  Nuu-chah-nulth Central Region First Nations Governance Structures 2007/2008, Vancouver, September 2008.

See also

Pacheedaht First Nation
Makah
Nuu-chah-nulth Economic Development Corporation
Nuu-chah-nulth Employment and Training Program
List of tribal councils in British Columbia

External links
Nuu-chah-nulth Tribal Council homepage

Nuu-chah-nulth governments
First Nations tribal councils in British Columbia
Port Alberni